Wessex is an electoral ward of South Somerset District Council in Somerset, England. It is one of the wards that makes up the parliamentary constituency of Somerton and Frome.

The small town of Somerton is the main settlement in the ward, which also includes Compton Dundon.

The ward is represented by two councillors; in the district elections of 2015 one Conservative Party candidate and one Liberal Democrat candidate were elected.

References

Wards of South Somerset